Stoffer is a surname. Notable people with the surname include:

Chris Stoffer (born 1974), Dutch politician
Ferry Stoffer (born 1985), Dutch Grand Prix motorcycle racer
Joel Stoffer, American actor
Julie Stoffer (born 1979), American television host
Peter Stoffer (born 1956), Canadian politician
Thijs Stoffer, Netherlands Chairman of the Kandersteg International Scout Centre Committee

Surnames from given names